Super Deluxe was an entertainment company owned by Turner Broadcasting. The company's main output was in online video, television series, and documentaries.

History
Turner Broadcasting System announced the launch of Super Deluxe, a digital comedy website, in October 2006. Super Deluxe was first launched on January 17, 2007 and featured digital shorts by comedians including Bob Odenkirk, Maria Bamford, Tim Heidecker and Eric Wareheim. The website was folded into Adult Swim.com on May 7, 2008.

Revival
Super Deluxe was relaunched as a new entity in late 2015. The "new" Super Deluxe was a separate entity from its original incarnation, only connected by name. The network features short form videos including comedic shorts, political satire, animation, and music videos. The Super Deluxe production studio focuses on television series and feature films.

Among these videos are Donald Trump related videos by Vic Berger, a frequent collaborator for the comedy duo Tim & Eric. Each of these videos remixes various debate appearances with air horns and crowds chanting Trump's name. During both the 2016 Republican National Convention and the 2016 Democratic National Convention, both Berger and Tim Heidecker covered the events on the Super Deluxe channel.
Berger also created an "Oscar bait" version of the 2015 film Straight Outta Compton for Super Deluxe.

In 2017, Vicente Fox, the former President of Mexico, appeared in a series of videos on the channel. In these videos, Fox criticized Trump on a variety of issues including his proposal to build a wall between America and Mexico and his Cinco de Mayo taco bowl tweet.

In September 2018, it was announced that Super Deluxe, alongside Blink Industries and Conaco, would be producing new episodes of the British web series, Don't Hug Me I'm Scared.

On October 19, 2018, Turner Entertainment announced that it would be shutting down Super Deluxe, citing duplication with other WarnerMedia lines of business.

On August 9, 2019, American entertainment company Fullscreen acquired the rights to Super Deluxe and has rebranded the company as Tatered, focusing on similar content as its predecessor. The first Tatered video was uploaded on August 26, 2019, announcing the rebrand and future content.

Series produced for Super Deluxe
Various Super Deluxe programs have featured celebrities such as Billie Eilish, Maria Bamford, Richard Belzer, Norm MacDonald, Bob Odenkirk, Tim & Eric, Chelsea Peretti, Nick Swardson, Nathan Fielder, Oliver Tree, Toby Radloff, and Mike Krol.

First iteration (2007-2008)
All listed video series from December 16, 2008. Many of these series have made their way to individual YouTube channels, acquired by other networks, or evolved into larger shows.

 ["(Layers)"]
 Adventures With The Ambersons
 All My Exes
 Belzervizion
 Black Supaman
 Bobby's Beautiful Bed & Breakfast
 Bobby-Q
 Boxland
 Bronx World Travelers
 Cakey!
 Can't Sleep
 Chasing Donovan
 Children's Guide To Growing Up
 China, IL
 Chunklet Invades Austin
 Chunklet T.N.A. - Rolling Deep
 Comedy by the Numbers
 Country Public Broadcasting System
 Crazy Ass Mofo
 Curious Crackhead
 Danger Squad Action Kickass Team
 David Neher's Homemade Show
 DCLugi TV
 Derek and Simon: The Show 
 Diary Of A Lonely DJ, The
 Doing His Best James Dean
 Fark TV
 Formaldehyde Theatre
 Freddy Lockhart's Mixed Media
 Good Side Of Bad News
 Grandma's Inter-web Show
 Hawaiian Tropic
 I Am Baby Cakes
 I Hate My Roommates
 Inhuman Resources
 Kill Me Now
 Killer Mike's Grind Time Sports Show Bang! Bang! Bang!
 Kinda Like News
 Kitten vs. Newborn
 Life 101
 Little Michael Jackson And Me
 Making Friends with Chelsea Peretti
 Maria Bamford Show
 Mater P Theatre
 Maximus Puss
 Miss Artemis: Pet Regressor
 Norm MacDonald Presents: The Fake News
 Party Animals
 Penelope Princess of Pets
 Position of the Day
 Powerloafing
 Psych Ward
 Real Scientific
 Robots vs. Dragons
 Sam's Home
 Scream Engine IV
 Sexus
 Sourced Out
 Space Talk From Dimension Eugene
 Standrea
 Subconscious Channel
 Super Amazing Innovations
 Super Deluxe Newsletter
 Super Deluxe Podcasts
 The Freeloader's Guide To Easy Living
 The Hands Of God
 The Law Of The Jungle
 The Littlest Panther
 The Post Show
 The Professor Brothers
 The Snuz Brothers
 The Ted Zone
 The Wayne & Toby Show
 This Is Now
 Tim and Eric Nite Live!
 Tim And Eric Not Live
 Time Suck
 Too Soon?
 Treasure Trail
 Ulysses S. Grant
 Viral Vidiocy
 W's World
 What's Your Story?
 Whiskers and Mr. Fancy
 Y'all So Stupid
 You Asked For It

Revived iteration (2015-2018)

Series ended when Super Deluxe was closed
 Cheap Thrills (20172018)
 Memesplaining (2018)
 Sex Stuff (2018)
 Thrift Haul with Fat Tony (20172018)
 On Blast (2018)
 Animefit9000 with Caleon Fox (2018)
 Free 4 Me (2018)
 Robot Takeover (2018)
 Food Land (2018)

Former series
 AnimeFit 9000 (2018)
 Caring (2016)
 Dark Day (2016)
 David (2016)
 Disengaged (20152016)
 Fridays (2016)
 Future You (2016)
 Kick Me (2018)
 Magic Funhouse! (2016; moved to Fullscreen)
 Mind Jack (2016)
 Riders (2016)
 Total Hack (2018)
 Turnt Beauty (20162018)
 Xtra Sauce (2018)
 YoMeryl’s Panic Attacks (2017)

Produced TV Series
 Chambers
 This Close
 Don't Hug Me I'm Scared (unaired TV pilot)

References

Further reading

External links 
 

Online mass media companies of the United States
Defunct video on demand services
Turner Broadcasting System
Internet properties established in 2007
Internet properties established in 2015
Internet properties disestablished in 2008
Internet properties disestablished in 2018